Guy Bwele (born 16 February 1984 at Cameroon) is a Cameroon footballer. He can play as a defender or as a midfielder . He currently plays for Hobart Zebras in the Tasmanian Victory League.

Bwele was always confused with Guy Bwelle, which caused some controversy.

Career
Bwele played for Sports Etudes in his homeland before attending a trial with Norwegian football club, IK Start in 2007. He played in a friendly game with IK Start against FC Copenhagen. However, caused by a great controversy (see controversy), Bwele failed to get a contract.

He returned to Cameroon and was reported to play for local club, Coton Sport FC de Garoua.

In early November 2011, Bwele joined the Malaysian club, Sarawak FA in the Malaysia Super League, signing a two-year contract alongside fellow countrymen, Kalle Sone. Bwele was made captain for the game against Johor FC on 14 February 2012 in the absence of regular captain Mohd Hairol Mokhtar, and scored his first goal for the team as Sarawak won the game 2–1 having trailed the match 1–0.

Bwele first season with Sarawak ended with disappointment as Sarawak were relegated to Premier League having losing the end-of-season relegation playoff match. However, in his second year with Sarawak, Bwele helped Sarawak to clinch the 2013 Malaysia Premier League title and promotion to 2014 Malaysia Super League, finishing the season unbeaten in the league. Sarawak also progressed to the quarterfinals of 2013 Malaysia FA Cup and semi-finals of 2013 Malaysia Cup. Sarawak released Bwele at the conclusion of his 2-year contract in November 2013. It is reported that Guy Bwele has sign one-year contract with KL SPA Putrajaya FC for 2014 Malaysia Premier League competition during the second window in March 2014. His first game was against the league leader Pulau Pinang and they manage to hold a draw 0–0 result to surprise many.

International career
It was reported that Bwele had played six matches with the Cameroon, which two of the caps are official for his national team.

Controversy
In July 2007, there was another footballer from Cameroon with the same name who was playing for the Greek team, Ergotelis FC, officially named Guy Bwelle which was 28 years old that time. It was reported that Guy Bwelle had suddenly left the club. The other Guy Bwelle, was on trial with Norwegian club IK Start. This controversy immediately attracted the media shortly after the second Guy Bwelle appeared with a friendly against FC Copenhagen.

However, the second Guy Bwelle did not manage to get a contract as the Norwegian football authorities had expressed concern that he might have falsely used Bwelle's identity.

It later turned out that the second Guy Bwelle might be his cousin, and his name is different as the person who attended the trial, who was born in 1984, is officially named Guy Bwele, not Guy Bwelle.

Honours

Clubs
Coton Sport FC de Garoua
Cameroon Premiere Division: 2008, 2010, 2011
Cameroon Cup: 2008, 2011

Sarawak FA
Malaysia Premier League: 2013

References

External links
 
 

1984 births
Living people
Cameroonian footballers
Sarawak FA players
Association football forwards
Cameroonian expatriate footballers
Expatriate footballers in Malaysia